Bugewitz is a municipality in the Vorpommern-Greifswald district, in Mecklenburg-Vorpommern in north-eastern Germany. It is the least densely populated municipality in what was East Germany, and the fifth-least densely populated in all of Germany. All four municipalities of lesser population density (Wiedenborstel, Büttel, Gröde, and Fredeburg) are located in Schleswig-Holstein.

Sights 

 Karnin Lift Bridge
 Szczecin Lagoon
 Anklamer Torfmoor
 Bugewitz Church
 Ferry port and Kamp Marina with nearby mainland link, the Karnin Lift Bridge
 Bugewitz Barrow

References

Vorpommern-Greifswald